Wrightstown High School is a secondary education institution located in Wrightstown, Wisconsin. It has approximately 450 students and 27 full-time faculty. WHS falls under the authority of the Wrightstown Community School District. Its athletic teams are known as the Tigers, and play in the North Eastern Conference.

External links 
Wrightstown High School

Public high schools in Wisconsin
Schools in Brown County, Wisconsin